Ana Paula de Alencar (born ) is a Brazilian group rhythmic gymnast. She represents her nation at international competitions. She competed at world championships, including at the 2010 World Rhythmic Gymnastics Championships.

References

1992 births
Living people
Brazilian rhythmic gymnasts
Place of birth missing (living people)
South American Games gold medalists for Brazil
South American Games silver medalists for Brazil
South American Games medalists in gymnastics
Competitors at the 2010 South American Games
21st-century Brazilian women